Lake Havasu City Airport , also known as Lake Havasu City Municipal Airport, is a city-owned public-use airport located  north of the central business district of Lake Havasu City, in Mohave County, Arizona, United States.

The airport is mostly used for general aviation. Until May 5, 2007, scheduled service to Phoenix and Las Vegas was provided by Mesa Airlines, operating as US Airways Express (previously America West Express).

As per Federal Aviation Administration records, the airport had 8,174 commercial passenger boardings (enplanements) in calendar year 2005 and 6,082 enplanements in 2006. According to the FAA's National Plan of Integrated Airport Systems for 2007–2011, Lake Havasu City Airport is classified as commercial service - non-primary because it has between 2,500 and 10,000 passenger boardings per year.

Facilities and aircraft 

 14/32 measuring 8,000 x 100 ft (2,438 x 30 m)

For the 12-month period ending April 30, 2019, the airport had 47,675 aircraft operations, an average of 131 per day: 95% general aviation, 4% air taxi and 1% military. There was 143 aircraft based at this airport: 115 single engine, 15 multi-engine, 5 jet aircraft, 3 helicopter and 5 ultralight.

Incidents and accidents

On April 23, 2018, an Air Force F-16 fighter jet crash landed while attempting an emergency landing during a routine training flight. The pilot ejected safely as the plane went off the end of the runway.

Cargo airline

References

External links 
 Lake Havasu City Municipal Airport at official city website
 Lake Havasu City Airport (HII) at Arizona DOT airport directory

Airports in Mohave County, Arizona
Lake Havasu City, Arizona